Carbon fiber-reinforced polymers (American English), carbon-fibre-reinforced polymers (Commonwealth English),  carbon-fiber-reinforced plastics, carbon-fiber reinforced-thermoplastic (CFRP, CRP, CFRTP), also known as carbon fiber, carbon composite, or just carbon, are extremely strong and light fiber-reinforced plastics that contain carbon fibers. CFRPs can be expensive to produce, but are commonly used wherever high strength-to-weight ratio and stiffness (rigidity) are required, such as aerospace, superstructures of ships, automotive, civil engineering, sports equipment, and an increasing number of consumer and technical applications.

The binding polymer is often a thermoset resin such as epoxy, but other thermoset or thermoplastic polymers, such as polyester, vinyl ester, or nylon, are sometimes used. The properties of the final CFRP product can be affected by the type of additives introduced to the binding matrix (resin). The most common additive is silica, but other additives such as rubber and carbon nanotubes can be used.

Carbon fiber is sometimes referred to as graphite-reinforced polymer or graphite fiber-reinforced polymer (GFRP is less common, as it clashes with glass-(fiber)-reinforced polymer).

Properties
CFRP are composite materials. In this case the composite consists of two parts: a matrix and a reinforcement. In CFRP the reinforcement is carbon fiber, which provides its strength. The matrix is usually a thermosetting plastic, such as polyester resin, to bind the reinforcements together. Because CFRP consists of two distinct elements, the material properties depend on these two elements.

Reinforcement gives CFRP its strength and rigidity, measured by stress and elastic modulus respectively. Unlike isotropic materials like steel and aluminum, CFRP has directional strength properties. The properties of CFRP depend on the layouts of the carbon fiber and the proportion of the carbon fibers relative to the polymer. The two different equations governing the net elastic modulus of composite materials using the properties of the carbon fibers and the polymer matrix can also be applied to carbon fiber reinforced plastics. The following equation,

The other extreme case of the elastic modulus of the composite with the fibers oriented transverse to the applied load can be found using the following equation:

The fracture toughness of carbon fiber reinforced plastics is governed by the following mechanisms: 1) debonding between the carbon fiber and polymer matrix, 2) fiber pull-out, and 3) delamination between the CFRP sheets. Typical epoxy-based CFRPs exhibit virtually no plasticity, with less than 0.5% strain to failure. Although CFRPs with epoxy have high strength and elastic modulus, the brittle fracture mechanics present unique challenges to engineers in failure detection since failure occurs catastrophically. As such, recent efforts to toughen CFRPs include modifying the existing epoxy material and finding alternative polymer matrix. One such material with high promise is PEEK, which exhibits an order of magnitude greater toughness with similar elastic modulus and tensile strength. However, PEEK is much more difficult to process and more expensive.

Despite its high initial strength-to-weight ratio, a design limitation of CFRP is its lack of a definable fatigue limit. This means, theoretically, that stress cycle failure cannot be ruled out. While steel and many other structural metals and alloys do have estimable fatigue or endurance limits, the complex failure modes of composites mean that the fatigue failure properties of CFRP are difficult to predict and design against. As a result, when using CFRP for critical cyclic-loading applications, engineers may need to design in considerable strength safety margins to provide suitable component reliability over its service life.

Environmental effects such as temperature and humidity can have profound effects on the polymer-based composites, including most CFRPs. While CFRPs demonstrate excellent corrosion resistance, the effect of moisture at wide ranges of temperatures can lead to degradation of the mechanical properties of CFRPs, particularly at the matrix-fiber interface. While the carbon fibers themselves are not affected by the moisture diffusing into the material, the moisture plasticizes the polymer matrix. This led to significant changes in properties that are dominantly influenced by the matrix in CFRPs such as compressive, interlaminar shear, and impact properties. The epoxy matrix used for engine fan blades is designed to be impervious against jet fuel, lubrication, and rain water, and external paint on the composites parts is applied to minimize damage from ultraviolet light.

Carbon fibers can cause galvanic corrosion when CRP parts are attached to aluminum or mild steel but not to stainless steel or titanium.

Carbon Fiber Reinforced Plastics are very hard to machine, and causes significant tool wear. The tool wear in CFRP machining is dependent on the fiber orientation and machining condition of the cutting process. To reduce tool wear various types of coated tools are used in machining CFRP and CFRP-metal stack.

Manufacture

The primary element of CFRP is a carbon filament; this is produced from a precursor polymer such as polyacrylonitrile (PAN), rayon, or petroleum pitch. For synthetic polymers such as PAN or rayon, the precursor is first spun into filament yarns, using chemical and mechanical processes to initially align the polymer chains in a way to enhance the final physical properties of the completed carbon fiber. Precursor compositions and mechanical processes used during spinning filament yarns may vary among manufacturers. After drawing or spinning, the polymer filament yarns are then heated to drive off non-carbon atoms (carbonization), producing the final carbon fiber. The carbon fibers filament yarns may be further treated to improve handling qualities, then wound on to bobbins. From these fibers, a unidirectional sheet is created. These sheets are layered onto each other in a quasi-isotropic layup, e.g. 0°, +60°, or −60° relative to each other.

From the elementary fiber, a bidirectional woven sheet can be created, i.e. a twill with a 2/2 weave. The process by which most CFRPs are made varies, depending on the piece being created, the finish (outside gloss) required, and how many of the piece will be produced. In addition, the choice of matrix can have a profound effect on the properties of the finished composite.

Many CFRP parts are created with a single layer of carbon fabric that is backed with fiberglass. A tool called a chopper gun is used to quickly create these composite parts. Once a thin shell is created out of carbon fiber, the chopper gun cuts rolls of fiberglass into short lengths and sprays resin at the same time, so that the fiberglass and resin are mixed on the spot. The resin is either external mix, wherein the hardener and resin are sprayed separately, or internal mixed, which requires cleaning after every use.
Manufacturing methods may include the following:

Molding
One method of producing CFRP parts is by layering sheets of carbon fiber cloth into a mold in the shape of the final product. The alignment and weave of the cloth fibers is chosen to optimize the strength and stiffness properties of the resulting material. The mold is then filled with epoxy and is heated or air-cured. The resulting part is very corrosion-resistant, stiff, and strong for its weight. Parts used in less critical areas are manufactured by draping cloth over a mold, with epoxy either preimpregnated into the fibers (also known as pre-preg) or "painted" over it. High-performance parts using single molds are often vacuum-bagged and/or autoclave-cured, because even small air bubbles in the material will reduce strength. An alternative to the autoclave method is to use internal pressure via inflatable air bladders or EPS foam inside the non-cured laid-up carbon fiber.

Vacuum bagging
For simple pieces of which relatively few copies are needed (1–2 per day), a vacuum bag can be used. A fiberglass, carbon fiber, or aluminum mold is polished and waxed, and has a release agent applied before the fabric and resin are applied, and the vacuum is pulled and set aside to allow the piece to cure (harden). There are three ways to apply the resin to the fabric in a vacuum mold.

The first method is manual and called a wet layup, where the two-part resin is mixed and applied before being laid in the mold and placed in the bag. The other one is done by infusion, where the dry fabric and mold are placed inside the bag while the vacuum pulls the resin through a small tube into the bag, then through a tube with holes or something similar to evenly spread the resin throughout the fabric. Wire loom works perfectly for a tube that requires holes inside the bag. Both of these methods of applying resin require hand work to spread the resin evenly for a glossy finish with very small pin-holes.

A third method of constructing composite materials is known as a dry layup. Here, the carbon fiber material is already impregnated with resin (pre-preg) and is applied to the mold in a similar fashion to adhesive film. The assembly is then placed in a vacuum to cure. The dry layup method has the least amount of resin waste and can achieve lighter constructions than wet layup. Also, because larger amounts of resin are more difficult to bleed out with wet layup methods, pre-preg parts generally have fewer pinholes. Pinhole elimination with minimal resin amounts generally require the use of autoclave pressures to purge the residual gases out.

Compression molding
A quicker method uses a compression mold, also commonly known as carbon fiber forging. This is a two (male and female), or multi-piece mold, usually made out of aluminum or steel and more recently 3d printed plastic.  The mold components are pressed together with the fabric and resin loaded into the inner cavity that ultimately becomes the desired component. The benefit is the speed of the entire process. Some car manufacturers, such as BMW, claimed to be able to cycle a new part every 80 seconds. However, this technique has a very high initial cost since the molds require CNC machining of very high precision.

Filament winding
For difficult or convoluted shapes, a filament winder can be used to make CFRP parts by winding filaments around a mandrel or a core.

Applications
Applications for CFRP include the following:

Aerospace engineering

The Airbus A350 XWB is built of 52% CFRP including wing spars and fuselage components, overtaking the Boeing 787 Dreamliner, for the aircraft with the highest weight ratio for CFRP, which is 50%. This was one of the first commercial aircraft to have wing spars made from composites. The Airbus A380 was one of the first commercial airliners to have a central wing-box made of CFRP; it is the first to have a smoothly contoured wing cross-section instead of the wings being partitioned span-wise into sections. This flowing, continuous cross section optimises aerodynamic efficiency. Moreover, the trailing edge, along with the rear bulkhead, empennage, and un-pressurised fuselage are made of CFRP. However, many delays have pushed order delivery dates back because of problems with the manufacture of these parts. Many aircraft that use CFRP have experienced delays with delivery dates due to the relatively new processes used to make CFRP components, whereas metallic structures have been studied and used on airframes for years, and the processes are relatively well understood. A recurrent problem is the monitoring of structural ageing, for which new methods are constantly investigated, due to the unusual multi-material and anisotropic nature of CFRP.

In 1968 a Hyfil carbon-fiber fan assembly was in service on the Rolls-Royce Conways of the Vickers VC10s operated by BOAC.

Specialist aircraft designers and manufacturers Scaled Composites have made extensive use of CFRP throughout their design range, including the first private crewed spacecraft Spaceship One. CFRP is widely used in micro air vehicles (MAVs) because of its high strength to weight ratio.

Automotive engineering

CFRPs are extensively used in high-end automobile racing. The high cost of carbon fiber is mitigated by the material's unsurpassed strength-to-weight ratio, and low weight is essential for high-performance automobile racing. Race-car manufacturers have also developed methods to give carbon fiber pieces strength in a certain direction, making it strong in a load-bearing direction, but weak in directions where little or no load would be placed on the member. Conversely, manufacturers developed omnidirectional carbon fiber weaves that apply strength in all directions. This type of carbon fiber assembly is most widely used in the "safety cell" monocoque chassis assembly of high-performance race-cars. The first carbon fiber monocoque chassis was introduced in Formula One by McLaren in the 1981 season. It was designed by John Barnard and was widely copied in the following seasons by other F1 teams due to the extra rigidity provided to the chassis of the cars.

Many supercars over the past few decades have incorporated CFRP extensively in their manufacture, using it for their monocoque chassis as well as other components. As far back as 1971, the Citroën SM offered optional lightweight carbon fiber wheels.

Use of the material has been more readily adopted by low-volume manufacturers who used it primarily for creating body-panels for some of their high-end cars due to its increased strength and decreased weight compared with the glass-reinforced polymer they used for the majority of their products.

Civil engineering

CFRP has become a notable material in structural engineering applications. Studied in an academic context as to its potential benefits in construction, it has also proved itself cost-effective in a number of field applications strengthening concrete, masonry, steel, cast iron, and timber structures. Its use in industry can be either for retrofitting to strengthen an existing structure or as an alternative reinforcing (or pre-stressing) material instead of steel from the outset of a project.

Retrofitting has become the increasingly dominant use of the material in civil engineering, and applications include increasing the load capacity of old structures (such as bridges) that were designed to tolerate far lower service loads than they are experiencing today, seismic retrofitting, and repair of damaged structures. Retrofitting is popular in many instances as the cost of replacing the deficient structure can greatly exceed the cost of strengthening using CFRP.

Applied to reinforced concrete structures for flexure, CFRP typically has a large impact on strength (doubling or more the strength of the section is not uncommon), but only a moderate increase in stiffness (perhaps a 10% increase). This is because the material used in this application is typically very strong (e.g., 3 GPa ultimate tensile strength, more than 10 times mild steel) but not particularly stiff (150 to 250 GPa, a little less than steel, is typical). As a consequence, only small cross-sectional areas of the material are used. Small areas of very high strength but moderate stiffness material will significantly increase strength, but not stiffness.

CFRP can also be applied to enhance shear strength of reinforced concrete by wrapping fabrics or fibers around the section to be strengthened. Wrapping around sections (such as bridge or building columns) can also enhance the ductility of the section, greatly increasing the resistance to collapse under earthquake loading. Such 'seismic retrofit' is the major application in earthquake-prone areas, since it is much more economic than alternative methods.

If a column is circular (or nearly so) an increase in axial capacity is also achieved by wrapping. In this application, the confinement of the CFRP wrap enhances the compressive strength of the concrete. However, although large increases are achieved in the ultimate collapse load, the concrete will crack at only slightly enhanced load, meaning that this application is only occasionally used. Specialist ultra-high modulus CFRP (with tensile modulus of 420 GPa or more) is one of the few practical methods of strengthening cast-iron beams. In typical use, it is bonded to the tensile flange of the section, both increasing the stiffness of the section and lowering the neutral axis, thus greatly reducing the maximum tensile stress in the cast iron.

In the United States, pre-stressed concrete cylinder pipes (PCCP) account for a vast majority of water transmission mains. Due to their large diameters, failures of PCCP are usually catastrophic and affect large populations. Approximately  of PCCP have been installed between 1940 and 2006. Corrosion in the form of hydrogen embrittlement has been blamed for the gradual deterioration of the pre-stressing wires in many PCCP lines. Over the past decade, CFRPs have been used to internally line PCCP, resulting in a fully structural strengthening system. Inside a PCCP line, the CFRP liner acts as a barrier that controls the level of strain experienced by the steel cylinder in the host pipe. The composite liner enables the steel cylinder to perform within its elastic range, to ensure the pipeline's long-term performance is maintained. CFRP liner designs are based on strain compatibility between the liner and host pipe.

CFRP is a more costly material than its counterparts in the construction industry, glass fiber-reinforced polymer (GFRP) and aramid fiber-reinforced polymer (AFRP), though CFRP is, in general, regarded as having superior properties. Much research continues to be done on using CFRP both for retrofitting and as an alternative to steel as a reinforcing or pre-stressing material. Cost remains an issue and long-term durability questions still remain. Some are concerned about the brittle nature of CFRP, in contrast to the ductility of steel. Though design codes have been drawn up by institutions such as the American Concrete Institute, there remains some hesitation among the engineering community about implementing these alternative materials. In part, this is due to a lack of standardization and the proprietary nature of the fiber and resin combinations on the market.

Carbon-fiber microelectrodes
Carbon fibers are used for fabrication of carbon-fiber microelectrodes. In this application typically a single carbon fiber with diameter of 5–7 μm is sealed in a glass capillary. At the tip the capillary is either sealed with epoxy and polished to make carbon-fiber disk microelectrode or the fiber is cut to a length of 75–150 μm to make carbon-fiber cylinder electrode. Carbon-fiber microelectrodes are used either in amperometry or fast-scan cyclic voltammetry for detection of biochemical signaling.

Sports goods

CFRP is now widely used in sports equipment such as in squash, tennis, and badminton racquets, sport kite spars, high-quality arrow shafts, hockey sticks, fishing rods, surfboards, high end swim fins, and rowing shells. Amputee athletes such as Jonnie Peacock use carbon fiber blades for running. It is used as a shank plate in some basketball sneakers to keep the foot stable, usually running the length of the shoe just above the sole and left exposed in some areas, usually in the arch.

Controversially, in 2006, cricket bats with a thin carbon-fiber layer on the back were introduced and used in competitive matches by high-profile players including Ricky Ponting and Michael Hussey. The carbon fiber was claimed to merely increase the durability of the bats, but it was banned from all first-class matches by the ICC in 2007.

A CFRP bicycle frame weighs less than one of steel, aluminum, or titanium having the same strength. The type and orientation of the carbon-fiber weave can be designed to maximize stiffness in required directions. Frames can be tuned to address different riding styles: sprint events require stiffer frames while endurance events may require more flexible frames for rider comfort over longer periods. The variety of shapes it can be built into has further increased stiffness and also allowed aerodynamic tube sections. CFRP forks including suspension fork crowns and steerers, handlebars, seatposts, and crank arms are becoming more common on medium as well as higher-priced bicycles. CFRP rims remain expensive but their stability compared to aluminium reduces the need to re-true a wheel and the reduced mass reduces the moment of inertia of the wheel. CFRP spokes are rare and most carbon wheelsets retain traditional stainless steel spokes. CFRP also appears increasingly in other components such as derailleur parts, brake and shifter levers and bodies, cassette sprocket carriers, suspension linkages, disc brake rotors, pedals, shoe soles, and saddle rails. Although strong and light, impact, over-torquing, or improper installation of CFRP components has resulted in cracking and failures, which may be difficult or impossible to repair.

Other applications

The fire resistance of polymers and thermo-set composites is significantly improved if a thin layer of carbon fibers is moulded near the surface because a dense, compact layer of carbon fibers efficiently reflects heat.

CFRP is being used in an increasing number of high-end products that require stiffness and low weight, these include:
Musical instruments, including violin bows; guitar picks, necks (carbon fiber rods), and pick-guards; drum shells; bagpipe chanters; and entire musical instruments such as Luis and Clark's carbon fiber cellos, violas, and violins; and Blackbird Guitars' acoustic guitars and ukuleles; also audio components such as turntables and loudspeakers.
Firearms use it to replace certain metal, wood, and fiberglass components but many of the internal parts are still limited to metal alloys as current reinforced plastics are unsuitable.
High-performance drone bodies and other radio-controlled vehicle and aircraft components such as helicopter rotor blades.
Lightweight poles such as: tripod legs, tent poles, fishing rods, billiards cues, walking sticks, and high-reach poles such as for window cleaning.
Dentistry, carbon fiber posts are used in restoring root canal treated teeth.
Railed train bogies for passenger service. This reduces the weight by up to 50% compared to metal bogies, which contributes to energy savings.
Laptop shells and other high performance cases.
Carbon woven fabrics.
Archery: carbon fiber arrows and bolts, stock (for crossbows) and riser (for vertical bows), and rail.
As a filament for the 3D fused deposition modeling printing process, carbon fiber-reinforced plastic (polyamide-carbon filament) is used for the production of sturdy but lightweight tools and parts due to its high strength and tear length.
District heating pipe rehabilitation, using CIPP method.

Disposal and recycling

CFRPs have a long service lifetime when protected from the sun. When it is time to decommission CFRPs, they cannot be melted down in air like many metals. When free of vinyl (PVC or polyvinyl chloride) and other halogenated polymers, CFRPs can be thermally decomposed via thermal depolymerization in an oxygen-free environment. This can be accomplished in a refinery in a one-step process. Capture and reuse of the carbon and monomers is then possible. CFRPs can also be milled or shredded at low temperature to reclaim the carbon fiber; however, this process shortens the fibers dramatically. Just as with downcycled paper, the shortened fibers cause the recycled material to be weaker than the original material. There are still many industrial applications that do not need the strength of full-length carbon fiber reinforcement. For example, chopped reclaimed carbon fiber can be used in consumer electronics, such as laptops. It provides excellent reinforcement of the polymers used even if it lacks the strength-to-weight ratio of an aerospace component.

Carbon nanotube reinforced polymer (CNRP)

In 2009, Zyvex Technologies introduced carbon nanotube-reinforced epoxy and carbon pre-pregs. Carbon nanotube reinforced polymer (CNRP) is several times stronger and tougher than CFRP and is used in the Lockheed Martin F-35 Lightning II as a structural material for aircraft. CNRP still uses carbon fiber as the primary reinforcement, but the binding matrix is a carbon nanotube-filled epoxy.

See also

Forged carbon fiber
Carbon-ceramic
Carbotanium

References

External links

Japan Carbon Fiber Manufacturers Association (English)
Engineers design composite bracing system for injured Hokie running back Cedric Humes
The New Steel a 1968 Flight article on the announcement of carbon fiber
Carbon Fibres – the First Five Years A 1971 Flight article on carbon fiber in the aviation field

Aerospace materials
Allotropes of carbon
Composite materials
Fibre-reinforced polymers
Synthetic fibers